Cindy Lynn Bradley (born December 11, 1977) is an American smooth jazz trumpet and flugelhorn player and composer.

Early life
Bradley was born in North Tonawanda in upstate New York. She already played piano, but picked up her first trumpet by accident at age nine because it was the only available instrument which she recognized in her teacher's list for school band classes. She began playing traditional jazz trumpet as a schoolgirl and went on to earn degrees in jazz studies at Ithaca College in New York state and in jazz trumpet performance at the New England Conservatory in Boston, Massachusetts.

Career
Bradley released her debut album Just a Little Bit on her own label in 2007. In 2009, she signed with Les Cutmore's Trippin' N' Rhythm Records and recorded her second, Bloom, with Grammy Award-winning producer Michael Broening at his studio in Phoenix, Arizona. Bloom won instant critical acclaim and Bradley followed it in 2011 with Unscripted. The hit single from that album, "Massive Transit", co-written by Bradley and Broening, remained at No. 1 on the US Billboard Smooth Jazz Songs chart for six weeks. Unscripted itself topped the Billboard Jazz Albums chart for two weeks.

Bradley cites her major influences in jazz as fellow trumpet players Freddie Hubbard, Lee Morgan, and Blue Mitchell. When she is not touring or playing at jazz festivals, she works as a public elementary school band teacher in New Jersey. Cindy is a longtime vegan and animal rights advocate.

Bradley's sixth solo album, The Little Things, was released in May 2019.

Awards
 2009 Catalina Island JazzTrax Festival Debut Artist of the Year
 2010 American Smooth Jazz Awards Best New Artist 
 2010 Smooth Jazz News Debut Artist of the Year
 2011 Oasis Contemporary Jazz Awards New Artist of the Year 
 2011 Oasis Contemporary Jazz Awards Brass Player of the Year
 2011 Jazziz magazine's Critics' Choice of the Year for Unscripted

Discography
As leader
 2007 Just a Little Bit (CB Jazz Music)
 2009 Bloom (Trippin' N' Rhythm Records)
 2011 Unscripted (Trippin' N' Rhythm Records)
 2014 Bliss (Trippin' N' Rhythm Records)
 2017 Natural (Trippin' N' Rhythm Records)
 2019 The Little Things (Trippin' N' Rhythm Records)

As sidewoman
 2005 The DIVA Jazz Orchestra A Tommy Newsom Tribute (Lightyear)
 2006 Cordovan Highway 10 Blues (Cordovan Records)
 2009 The Very Best of Christmas (Trippin' N' Rhythm Records)
 2010 Oli Silk All We Need (Trippin' N' Rhythm Records)
 2011 Nate Harasim Rush (Trippin' N' Rhythm Records)
 2011 Elan Trotman Love & Sax (E.T. Muzik Productions)
 2012 Phil Denny Crossover (Off Sheet Music)
 2012 Jay Stewart Enjoy the Ride (CD Baby)
 2012 Elizabeth Mis Breakaway (Trippin' N' Rhythm Records)
 2012 Pete Gitlin Amplify (Coming Together Music)
 2012 Paula Atherton Enjoy the Ride (Dot Time Records)
 2013 Kris Brownlee Sincerely Yours (Megawave Records)
 2013 Althea Rene In the Flow (Trippin' N' Rhythm Records)

References

External links
 Official Website
 Trippin' N' Rhythm Records http://www.trippinmusic.com/#/home/

1977 births
Living people
American jazz trumpeters
Ithaca College alumni
Jazz musicians from New York (state)
Musicians from New York (state)
New England Conservatory alumni
People from North Tonawanda, New York
Smooth jazz trumpeters